Warren Tallman (17 November 1921 – 1 July 1994) was an American-born poetry professor who influenced the Vancouver Tish poets.

History 
Born in Seattle, Tallman was raised in Tumwater, Washington. He attended the University of California, Berkeley on the G.I. Bill, writing dissertations on Henry James and Joseph Conrad. There he met Ellen King; they married in 1951.

In 1956, Tallman and his wife accepted teaching jobs in the English department at the University of British Columbia, helped Earle Birney and Roy Daniells to organize the creative writing department. In 1963, they hosted a poetry conference attended by Denise Levertov, Charles Olson, Allen Ginsberg, Robert Duncan, Margaret Avison, Robert Creeley, and Philip Whalen. The Tallman home itself also served as a poetry enclave of sorts. It was in the Tallman home that Jack Spicer gave some of his now legendary lectures. Two years later, they held another poetry conference in Berkeley, California.

Tallman was sometimes criticized for turning the Vancouver poetry circle into a California branch plant. Tallman embraced the Black Mountain school approach to poetry, but also showed the influence of the Beats, the New American Poets and the Language Poets. Among the Canadian poets he is said to have influenced are bill bissett, Stan Persky and Howard White.

Selected bibliography
 The Poetics of the New American Poetry New York: Grove, 1973.  (edited with Donald Allen)
 Godawful Streets of Man Toronto: Coach House, 1978.
 In the Midst Vancouver: Talonbooks, 1992.

Notes

References
 Author Bank: Warren Tallman at BC BookWorld

External links 
Records of Warren Tallman are held by Simon Fraser University's Special Collections and Rare Books

1921 births
1994 deaths
Canadian literary critics
Educators from Seattle
Academic staff of the University of British Columbia
People from Tumwater, Washington
American emigrants to Canada
University of California, Berkeley alumni